Gay Left was a collective of gay men and a journal of the same name which they published every six months in London between the years 1975 and 1980. It was formed after the dissolution of the Gay Liberation Front (GLF) and the Gay Marxist Group. Gay Left formed out of a reading group made up of members of the defunct Gay Marxist group.

Its goal was to contribute towards a Marxist analysis of homosexual oppression and to encourage in the gay movement an understanding of the links between the struggle against sexual oppression and the struggle for socialism.

The journal Gay Left initially described itself as "A Socialist Journal Produced by Gay Men", which evolved into "A Gay Socialist Journal" by the magazine's end, reflecting the internal debates that ran throughout Gay Left's life between the collective and lesbians who, though none ever joined the collective, frequently contributed articles.

The Collective 
In all a total of fifteen gay men became part of the collective at one point or another, with nine members at the start and nearly half of them forming part of the final eight. The group met on alternate Fridays and Sundays from 1974 until 1980. As well as editorial planning, the members also wrote a collective statement keynoting each issue.  The collective espoused radical leftist politics, influenced by thinkers such as Antonio Gramsci, Sigmund Freud and Michel Foucault, and by the successes of the gay rights and feminist movements.

Journal 
The journal published by the collective, Gay Left, combined theoretical articles with reviews and political reports. Alongside more historical articles like 'Where Engels Feared to Tread' (GL 1), which traced the evolution of Marxist attitudes towards sexuality and gender, were articles on struggles in the workplace like 'Gays and Trade Unions' (GL 1), 'The Gay Workers' Movement' (GL 2), 'All Worked UP' (GL 3), 'Gays at Work' (GL 6 and 7), and 'Work Place Politics: Gay Politics' (GL 10);  and pieces on the attitudes of leftist organisations towards the gay issue, such as 'A Grim Tale', about the International Socialists' Gay Group (GL 3) or 'Communists' Comment' (GL 4).

Gay Left was also a leader in exploring gay culture in its broadest sense. Gays in film formed a continuous theme following a ground- breaking article by Richard Dyer in GL 2, with regular reviews (for example, of Rainer Werner Fassbinder (GL 2)), and coverage of Ron Peck's attempts to make his film, Nighthawks (Peck was then a member of the collective and other members were involved in the film making). Andrew Britton challenged 'Camp' (GL 6), and there were pioneering articles on 'Gay Art', the gay singer, Tom Robinson and the theatre group Gay Sweatshop (GL 7). Richard Dyer's article 'In Defence of Disco' (GL 8) was one of the first to take disco seriously as an expression of the new gay consciousness. Mandy Merck explored Gays on TV in GL 10 at the start of what proved to be a revolution in the ways in which lesbians and gays were represented.

Contributors 
Gay Left's contributors included many experienced activists, particularly in the field of feminism, education and workplace politics.

Other activities 
Gay Left organised a conference in London in July 1977 titled "What is to Be Done?" (possibly after the famous pamphlet of the same name by Vladimir Lenin) and edited and wrote chapters for a book published by Allison and Busby in 1980 titled Homosexuality, Power and Politics. The book was re-published by Verso in October 2018. https://www.versobooks.com/books/2895-homosexuality .

See also

List of fictional gay characters
LGBT social movements
1970s in LGBT rights
LGBT rights by country or territory
Socialism and LGBT rights

References

External links
Gay Left
The Politics of Homosexuality

1975 establishments in England
1980 disestablishments in England
Gay men's magazines published in the United Kingdom
Cultural magazines published in the United Kingdom
Defunct political magazines published in the United Kingdom
LGBT collectives
LGBT culture in London
Defunct LGBT organisations in the United Kingdom
LGBT socialism
Magazines published in London
Magazines established in 1975
Magazines disestablished in 1980
Marxist magazines
Organizations established in 1975
Organizations disestablished in 1980
Socialism in England
Socialist magazines